Automeris amanda, commonly known as the peacock silkmoth or peacock moth, is a species of moth in the family Saturniidae. It is indigenous to South America.

Subspecies 

 Automeris amanda tucimana
 Automeris amanda amanda
 Automeris amanda amandocuscoensis
 Automeris amanda limpida
 Automeris amanda tucuman 
 Automeris amanda amandojunica
 Automeris amanda subobscura

References 

Moths described in 1900
Hemileucinae
Moths of South America